XHCM-FM is a radio station on 88.5 FM in Cuernavaca, Morelos. It is owned by Grupo Audiorama Morelos and carries a grupera format known as Buenisiima 88.5.

History

XHCM received its concession on January 19, 1968. The station later became "La Mexicana", a brand used until the Radiorama–Audiorama split of 2013. At that time, the station took on the Ke Buena brand from Televisa Radio. In 2017, Audiorama's stations all dropped their Televisa Radio formats, resulting in the current "Buenisiima" brand.

On September 19, 2017, the 2017 Central Mexico earthquake caused the collapse of the Torre Latinoamericana in Cuernavaca, which was home to Grupo Audiorama's Cuernavaca studios and offices as well as the transmitter facilities of XHCM and XHNG.

References

Radio stations in Morelos